G4221 Shanghai-Wuhan Expressway is an expressway in China. It starts at Shanghai, passing through Taicang, Changshu, Jiangyin, Jintan District of Changzhou, Lishui District of Nanjing, Ma'anshan, Chao Lake, Lujiang County, Yuexi County, Yingshan County and Tuanfeng County, ending in Wuhan.

References

Chinese national-level expressways
Expressways in Anhui
Expressways in Hubei
Expressways in Jiangsu
Expressways in Shanghai